Beatrice of Bavaria (1344 – 25 December 1359); Swedish: Beatrix; was Queen of Sweden as the consort of King Eric XII of Sweden (1339–1359) who co-ruled Sweden with his father King Magnus IV.

Biography
Beatrice was the daughter of the Louis IV, Holy Roman Emperor (1282–1347) and his second wife Margaret II, Countess of Hainaut (1311–1356). In 1356 she was married to Eric, who as the elder of two sons, became co-monarch after a rebellion against his father, Magnus IV (1316–1374) who was monarch of both Norway and Sweden. The younger son, Haakon (1340–1380) was to become became ruler of Norway. Beatrice was queen jointly with her mother-in-law, Blanche of Namur (1320–1363).

Beatrice and Eric both died in 1359. It is believed that her husband died of the Black Death, and that Beatrice, who gave birth to a stillborn son, also died of plague. Some historians believe she and her son were buried at the Black Friars' Monastery of Stockholm.

Ancestry

References

Other sources
 Åke Ohlmarks (1973) Alla Sveriges drottningar (Stockholm : Geber) 

14th-century German people
14th-century Swedish women
Swedish queens
House of Wittelsbach
1344 births
1359 deaths
14th-century deaths from plague (disease)
14th-century Swedish people
14th-century German women
Daughters of emperors
Children of Louis IV, Holy Roman Emperor
Daughters of kings